The men's road race was one of 18 cycling events of the 2016 Olympic Games in Rio de Janeiro. The race started and finished on 6 August at Fort Copacabana and was won by Greg Van Avermaet of Belgium. It was Belgium's first victory in the men's individual road race since 1952 and second overall, tying France and the Soviet Union for second-most behind Italy (five). Belgium matched Italy for most total medals, at seven. Jakob Fuglsang won Denmark's fourth silver medal in the event; the nation had yet to win gold. Rafał Majka's bronze was Poland's first medal in the event since 1980.

Qualification

Nations could earn qualification spots primarily through UCI tours. The top five nations at the UCI World Tour earned five quota places, with nations further down the rankings earning progressively fewer quota places. There were also up to three places per nation available through continental tours and championships. Individuals could also earn places if their nation's ranking was insufficient. A few places were reserved for the host nation and Tripartite Commission invitations.

Background
This was the 20th appearance of the event, previously held in 1896 and then at every Summer Olympics since 1936. It replaced the individual time trial event that had been held from 1912 to 1932; the time trial had been re-introduced in 1996 alongside the road race. Azerbaijan, the Dominican Republic, Kosovo, and Laos each made their debut in the men's individual road race. Great Britain made its 20th appearance in the event, the only nation to have competed in each appearance to date.

Pre-race favourites
Due to the grueling nature of the course, the riders expected to finish with a medal were all known for their climbing and descending skills. Favorites heading into the race were Alejandro Valverde, Vincenzo Nibali, Chris Froome, Joaquim Rodríguez and Julian Alaphilippe. If Froome had won gold, he would have become the first person to ever win Tour de France and the cycling road race in the same season.

Course
Starting at Fort Copacabana, the peloton headed west to pass through Ipanema, Barra, and Reserva Maripendi Beaches via the coastal road leading to the  Pontal / Grumari circuit loop. After four laps of the Grumari sector (99.2 km of 241.5 km), the course returned east via the same coastal road to enter the  Vista Chinesa Circuit loop at Gávea for three laps ( of ) before finishing back at Fort Copacabana. As with all road races in the Olympic Games, the athletes are escorted by law enforcement to keep traffic and bystanders out of harm's way. For the 2016 Olympics, escort for the riders is done by the Brazilian Federal Highway Police (PRF).

2016 Olympic cycling road course maps

Schedule

All times are Brasília Time (UTC−3).

Start list

The following NOCs had qualified riders to compete in the road race event. The following riders were confirmed by their respective NOCs.

Results
In the table below, "s.t." indicates that the rider crossed the finish line in the same group as the cyclist before him, and was therefore credited with the same finishing time.

References

Men's road race
2016 in men's road cycling
Cycling at the Summer Olympics – Men's road race
Men's events at the 2016 Summer Olympics